Epicopeia polydora is a moth of the family Epicopeiidae first described by John O. Westwood in 1841. It is found in south-east Asia, including Assam in India, Vietnam and Thailand.

The wingspan is 85–100 mm. The wings are deep black with red, white and shining metallic-blue markings, mimicking butterflies of the genus Atrophaneura. It is a day-flying moth.

References

Moths described in 1841
Epicopeiidae